Portrait of Carmen is a 1968 studio album by Carmen McRae, with arrangements by Oliver Nelson, Shorty Rogers, Benny Carter and Gene Di Novi.

Reception

The Allmusic review by Jason Ankeny awarded the album four stars and said that "Portrait of Carmen doesn't so much update the great Carmen McRae's sound and sensibility as it reflects a world that's finally caught up to her way of thinking, capitalizing on the irony and sophistication so long essential to her music to create a record that is both fiercely individual and universally accessible. The title's no afterthought...Portrait of Carmen captures her brilliance for posterity".

Track listing
 "I'm Always Drunk in San Francisco" (Tommy Wolf) - 3:04
 "Elusive Butterfly" (Bob Lind) - 3:03
 "Day by Day" (Sammy Cahn, Axel Stordahl, Paul Weston) - 2:28
 "When You Get Around Me" (Fred E. Ahlert) - 2:57
 "Walking Happy" (Cahn, Jimmy Van Heusen) - 2:40
 "My Very Own Person" (Gene Di Novi) - 2:59
 "Ask Any Woman" (Gerald Langley, J. Stewart) - 3:01
 "Boy, Do I Have a Surprise for You" (Novi) - 3:26
 "Loads of Love" (Richard Rodgers) - 3:58
 "I Haven't Got Anything Better to Do" (Lee Pockriss, Paul Vance) - 4:34
 "Wonder Why" (Nicholas Brodszky, Cahn) - 2:14

Personnel
Carmen McRae - vocals
Oliver Nelson - arranger
Shorty Rogers - arranger
Benny Carter
Gene Di Novi
Gene Cipriano - saxophone, flute
Harry Klee - flute
Lew McCreary - trombone
George Roberts
Louis Blackburn
Billy Byers
Frank Rosolino
Ernie Tack
Francis Howard
Dick Nash
David Duke - French horn
William Hinshaw
Harry Sigismonti
Dennis Budimir - guitar
Howard Roberts
Tommy Tedesco
John Collins
Dominick Fera - saxophone
Justin Gordon
John Lowe
Theodore Nash
Buddy Collette
Bill Green
Anthony Ortega
Frank Strozier
John Audino - trumpet
James Salko
Jimmy Zito
Bobby Bryant
Conte Candoli
Freddie Hill
Al Porcino
Richard Perissi - French horn
Harry Sigismonti
Ann Mason - harp
Ray Brown - double bass
Norman Simmons - piano
Earl Palmer - drums
Jack Perling
Shelly Manne
Victor Feldman - percussion
Lou Singer
Dale Anderson

References

Atlantic Records albums
Albums arranged by Oliver Nelson
Albums arranged by Shorty Rogers
Albums arranged by Benny Carter
Carmen McRae albums
1968 albums
Albums produced by Nesuhi Ertegun